South Otago High School is situated in Balclutha, Otago, in the South Island of New Zealand. It is the largest school in the South Otago region. The country's second longest river, the Clutha River, marks the northeastern boundary of the School's grounds.

The school has a strong rivalry with the smaller but older Tokomairiro High School in the neighbouring town of Milton. Links with the past at the school include a stand of oak trees, which dominate the school's grounds. These were already several decades old at the time of the school's founding. One of these oaks is commemorated on the school's arms, along with the Southern Cross. These two symbols also represent strength and a striving for higher ideals, also reflected in the school's motto of Fide et Fortitudine.

History
Founded in 1926, the school is one of the South Island's oldest non-urban full secondary schools. At its opening, the school roll was 135, and the school initially shared classrooms with other nearby schools until the completion of its own building - now the school's main block - on 5 hectares of land in 1927. The school's first rector was John Reid, who held the post until 1931. From the following year, J. Garfield Anderson became rector, a post he held until 1954, during which time the school grew greatly in both size and scope.

The school today
South Otago High School is a co-educational high school with a roll of 580 students, of whom some 15% are Māori. Facilities include several computer rooms, two gymnasia - one with squash courts and fitness room, art, music, and technology suites, and science laboratories. The school also boasts 17 hectares of superb sporting fields and courts.

In 2002 there was a small outbreak of group C meningococcal disease in Balclutha, and students at this school and at Rosebank Primary School were vaccinated against the disease.

In April 2006, South Otago High School became the first New Zealand school to run a Jeans for Genes day in aid of the Haemophilia Foundation of New Zealand. Jeans for Genes, a charitable event originating in the United Kingdom, sees schools raising funds to help children with genetic disorders through sponsored events on a day on which school uniform is temporarily replaced by the wearing of denim jeans.

In September 2008 new principal Nick Simpson reopened plans to establish an area computing facility.

Notable alumni

 Sir Ronald Algie - politician
 Lee Allan - Otago rugby player
 Tony Brown - All Blacks rugby player
 Kelvin Deaker - international rugby referee
 Tony Ensor - Otago rugby player, NZ sevens rugby player, Highlanders 
 Matt Faddes - Otago rugby player, NZ sevens rugby player, Highlanders 
 Paul Grant - Otago rugby player, All Blacks Sevens player
 Bill Manhire - writer
 Rachel Pullar - cricketer
 Sarah Tsukigawa - cricketer
 Robert Webster - virologist and global influenza expert
 Charles Willocks - All Blacks rugby player

Notes

External links
 School web site
 School's former website
 Meningococcal outbreak news

Further reading
 McLeod, G. and McKillop, A. (2001) Strong and True - Oak and Southern Cross: A History of South Otago High School, 1926-2001.

Educational institutions established in 1926
Secondary schools in Otago
Balclutha, New Zealand
1926 establishments in New Zealand